Ringelbach is a small river of Bavaria, Germany. It is a tributary of the Felchbach near Ettenstatt.

See also
List of rivers of Bavaria

Rivers of Bavaria
Weißenburg-Gunzenhausen
Rivers of Germany